Blanco is a rural unincorporated community located on State Highway 63 in Pittsburg County, Oklahoma, United States. The ZIP code is 74528. The Census Bureau defined a census-designated place (CDP) for Blanco in 2015; the 2010 population within the 2015 CDP boundary is 96 and contains 52 housing units.

Demographics

History
A post office was established at Blanco, Indian Territory on August 31, 1901.  Blanco was named for Ramón Blanco y Erenas, one-time governor general of Cuba. The post office opened August 31, 1901.  

At the time of its founding, the community was located in the Moshulatubbee District of the Choctaw Nation.  It was located in either Atoka County or Tobucksy County.  The settlement was in the area of the county boundary, and differing maps of the era show it in each.

Notable people
Pryor McBee, Major League Baseball pitcher, was born in Blanco in 1901.
Royce H. Savage, United States Federal Court judge, was born in Blanco in 1904.
Gene Stipe, the longest-serving member of the Oklahoma Senate, was born in Blanco in 1926.

Notes

Further reading
Shirk, George H. Oklahoma Place Names. Norman: University of Oklahoma Press, 1987. .

Unincorporated communities in Pittsburg County, Oklahoma
Unincorporated communities in Oklahoma